The Apo Duat or Dayic languages are a group of closely related languages spoken by the Kelabit, Lun Bawang, and related peoples. They are:
Kelabitic: Kelabit, Lengilu, Sa'ban, Tring
Lundayeh: Lun Bawang, Adang, Balait, Kolur, Lepu Potng, Lun Dayah, Lun Daye, Padas, Trusan

Putoh may be an additional language, or it may be a dialect of Lundayeh.

References